Percy Daniel Ellsworth III (born October 19, 1974 in Drewryville, Virginia) is a retired former American football safety in the National Football League for the New York Giants and the Cleveland Browns.  Ellsworth joined the Giants as an undrafted free agent in 1996 after playing college football at the University of Virginia.  He was teammates with Tiki Barber at both Virginia and with the Giants.  Ellsworth attended Southampton High School in Courtland, Virginia, where he was a Super Prep All-American as a senior.  He was the NFC Defensive Player of the Week for week 16 of the 1998 NFL season.

See also
History of the New York Giants (1994-present)

References

1974 births
Living people
American football safeties
Virginia Cavaliers football players
New York Giants players
Cleveland Browns players
People from Southampton County, Virginia